Yours Truly is the debut studio album by American singer Ariana Grande. It was released on August 30, 2013, by Republic Records. The album's songs were recorded over a nearly three-year period, with Harmony Samuels, Kenneth "Babyface" Edmonds, Patrick "J. Que" Smith and Grande's Victorious co-star Leon Thomas III, as well as others, handling the album's music production. Featured collaborators include Big Sean, Mika, Mac Miller, and The Wanted's Nathan Sykes.

Yours Truly draws stylistic influences off the music of Grande's artistic inspirations, including singers Whitney Houston, Amy Winehouse, Christina Aguilera and Mariah Carey. Musically, Yours Truly is a pop and R&B record, while incorporating 1990s hip hop, 1950s piano pop, and doo-wop music within its production. Stephen Thomas Erlewine of AllMusic noted that, with the help of Babyface, Grande was able to "re-create the vibe and feel of the '90s" with the album. It was positively reviewed by critics upon release, with praise on Grande's vocals.

Yours Truly debuted atop the US Billboard 200 chart, with over 138,000 units sold in its first week. It made Grande the fifteenth female artist ever debut at number-one in the United States with their debut album. The album was certified platinum by the Recording Industry Association of America (RIAA). It also garnered top ten peaks in Australia, Canada, Denmark, Ireland, Japan, the Netherlands and the United Kingdom. Yours Truly was featured in the Billboard 200 year-end charts of both 2013 and 2014.

The album was preceded by the release of the lead single, "The Way", on March 25, 2013. It became a top ten hit on the US Billboard Hot 100 chart, peaking at number nine. The second single, "Baby I", was released on July 22, 2013, and peaked at number 21 on the Hot 100. The third and final single, "Right There", was released on August 6, 2013, and reached number 84 in the US. Yours Truly was further promoted with live renditions of the album's songs during The Listening Sessions tour in 2013.

Background and conception

Work on Yours Truly began in August 2010 while Grande was in the process of filming Victorious and formally began to work on it with a record label after she was signed to Republic Records on August 10, 2011. By September 10 of that year, Grande already had 20 songs prepared and was going through the process of narrowing it down to 13. On December 12, 2011, Grande released "Put Your Hearts Up" as the intended first single for the album. The song was a bubblegum pop song, released with the intention of catering to Grande's core audience, which at that time was almost entirely made up by young children who knew her from Victorious.

In an interview in June 2012, Grande described everything on the album as being "50s, 60s doo-wop-inspired" and revealed that two new singles were going to be released before the album, one of which was called "Do You Love Me?" and featured SkyBlu. Song titles that leaked included "Honeymoon Avenue", "Tattooed Heart" "Daydreamin" and "Voodoo Love", which later were included on the final album. "Voodoo Love" did not make the final cut of the album but was later released on Grande's Soundcloud account in 2016. "You're My Only Shawty" did not make the final cut of the album and was eventually sold and given to Demi Lovato to record and include on her 2011 R&B-infused album Unbroken as "You're My Only Shorty".

In 2013, Grande met up with her label and expressed dissatisfaction with the direction the album was taking. In several interviews during 2013, she admitted to having completely disliked her debut single, "Put Your Hearts Up", and not having an interest in pursuing music of that genre. She expressed a desire to make the type of music she grew up listening to, which was, "urban pop, 90s music." Grande's team had asked rapper Iggy Azalea to work on a feature for the album, but Azalea turned it down. The two later collaborated on "Problem", which was featured on Grande's second album My Everything.

The album was originally announced as Daydreamin, named after one of the songs included in the album and was slated for an early September release, but Grande decided to later rename it to Yours Truly, because the album felt like a love letter.

The album is inspired by a variety of different artists, ranging from Amy Winehouse and Christina Aguilera to Mariah Carey and Whitney Houston. Grande describes the album's first half is a "throwback" to the R&B music of the 1990s, and the second half is she describes as "something that is very unique and very special that I've sort of written" which is completely original. In summation of the record she stated: "So half of it is a throwback and like very familiar feeling, feel-good, and then half of it is something that I've created that's sort of special and unique and refreshing and wonderful and I love it".

Composition

Music and lyrics
The musical style of Yours Truly explores a "retro style" sound mixing 1990s pop and R&B, with certain songs incorporating influences from mid-'90s hip hop, '50s piano pop, and doo-wop. Scott Interrante from PopMatters complimented the music presented in the album and noted that compositionally and production wise, "tropes of both styles are blended together effortlessly." As he perceived, "erratic programmed drums support the rich harmonies and piano chords of the more doo-wop songs and the R&B tracks are infused with a wide-eyed optimism more associated with the ‘60s pop style." Pitchforks Andrew Ryce felt that Grande opted "for a 90s hip-hop soul vibe that awkwardly sits with the more doo-wop-indebted songwriting."

Songs
The album opens with an orchestral intro that introduces the first track "Honeymoon Avenue", a downtempo song composed in the key of F-sharp major and set in a  time signature at a moderate tempo of 63 beats per minute. The song explores the 1950s musical style mixing doo-wop with an urban-inspired sound. Lyrically, "Honeymoon Avenue" uses several metaphors to speak about someone in a car being driven by her (romantic) partner. The driver is stuck to the same old route and driving mode that may make them crash. In interview with MTV, Grande explained its lyrics saying that "Honeymoon Avenue" "is about knowing you are at the end of a relationship and wishing it could not be the end and go back to the beginning and start over." The second track "Baby I" is drenched in a "retro sound" from 1990s R&B and pop sonority. Lyrically, "Baby I" is a confession on Grande's behalf admitting a special love for someone and how she can't formulate her strong feelings into words. The elements of "Baby I" are further illustrated by its use of finger snaps, a syncopated beat, horns and drums.

The third track "Right There" features guest appearance by rapper Big Sean. Musically, "Right There" also incorporates the influences frein 1990s R&B and urban music, mixing "stabbing synths", trap-inflected beat and a hip hop groove. Reviewing the song, Jason Lipshutz from Billboard noted that "while Big Sean boasts about his sexual prowess, Grande flaunts her typically impressive melismas before ratcheting up the emotion for the finale." The fourth track "Tattooed Heart" is a doo-wop song written in the key of G major with a tempo of 72 beats per minute in compound quadruple time while Grande's vocals spans from D4 to F5. "Piano" is built on a hand-clapped rhythm, pulsating beats and a piano loop.

Release and promotion

To promote her debut single "The Way", Grande visited various radio stations, including: Y-100 Miami, 93.3 FM, Z100, KIIS-FM, and 99–7 Now. Grande performed "The Way" at several concerts produced for Top 40 radio stations, including KIIS-FM's Wango Tango concert on May 11, 2013, in Los Angeles, 101.3 KDWB's Star Party concert on May 17 in Minneapolis, Kiss 108's Kiss Concert 2013 event on May 18 in Boston, 103.3 AMP Radio's Birthday Bash concert on June 30 also in Boston, and Mix 93.3's Red White & Boom concert on July 5 in Kansas City. Her first televised performance of the song was aired on May 29, 2013, on The Ellen DeGeneres Show.

On August 1, 2013, Grande revealed the official artwork for Yours Truly, which features her kneeling on a bed of roses in front of a pink background. Due to fan criticism, she quickly unveiled a new cover, which simply featured the singer standing beneath a spotlight in a black-and-white image. On August 7, 2013, Grande revealed the official track listing via iTunes, and Republic Records made pre-orders for the album available. A music video for "Almost Is Never Enough" a duet with The Wanted's Nathan Sykes premiered online on Vevo on August 19 to promote the film The Mortal Instruments: City of Bones. The track is featured on the film's official soundtrack. The album version of the track is two minutes longer and has been slightly altered. It debuted on the Billboard Hot 100 at number 84. "Popular Song" featuring Grande was released on December 21, 2012, as a single from Mika's third studio album, The Origin of Love. The album version of the song features vocals from the original songwriter, Priscilla Renea, and contains expletives. However, the single version removes Renea and replaces her with Grande, removing the expletives.

Grande performed "The Way" and "Baby I" at the 2013 MTV Video Music Awards' Preshow on August 25, 2013. The album was released on August 30, 2013 in Great Britain, and on September 3, 2013 in the United States. Grande performed "The Way" with Mac Miller on the Today along with "Tattooed Heart" on the day of the album's US release; she also performed the latter at the 2013 Style Awards on September 4, 2013. Grande also made several other appearances throughout the week appearing on Live! with Kelly and Michael, Today and Late Night With Jimmy Fallon, where she performing an acoustic version of "The Way".

The Listening Sessions

Grande embarked on her first solo concert tour titled The Listening Sessions in support of Yours Truly. Pre-sale tickets went on sale on July 18, 2013. Regular tickets went on sale on July 19. Pre-sale tickets had to be taken down early, as they were selling at such a fast rate that the tour was almost sold before regular tickets were available. Grande also was the opening act for the last three US dates of Justin Bieber's Believe Tour. The performances took place in Jacksonville, Tampa, and Atlanta on August 7, August 8, and August 10, in support of the album. It was at these Listening Sessions that Grande discovered the album reached number one on US iTunes.

Singles
"The Way" was released to digital retailers through Republic Records in the United States on March 26, 2013, as the album's official lead single. It was written by the song's producer, Harmony Samuels, alongside Amber Streeter, Al Sherrod Lambert, Jordin Sparks, Brenda Russell and Mac Miller, who is also featured in the song. Seven hours after its release on the iTunes Store, "The Way" topped its Top Singles chart. It debuted at number 10 on the US Billboard Hot 100, becoming Grande and Miller's first top-10 song on the chart. This made Ariana the first top-10 arrival for a lead female artist making her first Hot 100 appearance since Yael Naim, who launched with "New Soul" in 2008. The song peaked at number nine on the Billboard Hot 100. "The Way" sold over 120,000 units in the first 48 hours of release. Having sold over 219,000 units in its opening week, "The Way" holds the third best-selling first-week sales figure of 2013 behind Justin Timberlake's "Suit & Tie" and One Direction's "Best Song Ever". The song received a triple platinum certification by the Recording Industry Association of America (RIAA).

"Baby I" was released to digital retailers by Republic Records on July 22, 2013, as the second single from the album. It was written and produced by Kenneth "Babyface" Edmonds, Antonio Dixon and Patrick "J. Que" Smith. The song sold 141,000 copies in its first week and debuted at number 21 on the Billboard Hot 100 chart, becoming her second top forty hit. It also debuted at number six on the Hot Digital Songs chart, making Grande the only woman to debut two songs in the top-10 on the Hot Digital Songs chart during 2013. Filming for the song's music video took place July 28–29, 2013. Grande hinted that the video would "travel" back to the 1990s and that there would be "lots of color" and "lots of baggy clothes".

"Right There", featuring Big Sean, was released to digital retailers by Republic Records on August 6, 2013, as the third and final single. It was written by Grande, Carmen Reece, Lonny Bereal, James "J-Doe" Smith, Trey Starxx, Al Sherrod Lambert, Sean Anderson, Jeff Lorber, and Harmony Samuels, who also handled the song's production. "Right There" debuted on the US Billboard Hot 100 at number 84. It was then serviced to rhythmic contemporary radio on September 10, 2013.

Promotional singles
"Almost Is Never Enough" (featuring Nathan Sykes)
was released on August 19, 2013, as the promotional single from the album. It was also given to The Mortal Instruments: City of Bones.

Critical reception

At Metacritic, which assigns a weighted average score out of 100 based on ratings and reviews from mainstream critics, the album received an average of 81, based on 9 reviews, indicating "universal acclaim". At AllMusic, Matt Collar rated the album four stars out of five, saying that Yours Truly was "surprisingly sophisticated and unique" which showcases Grande's soulful R&B vocals. He stated that the album often "brings to mind the intonations of Mariah Carey which are most likely intentional." Collar closed the statement saying that Yours Truly "makes the most of her talent." Nick Catucci of Entertainment Weekly graded the album an A−, calling the album "pure pop bliss" and "one of the most purely enjoyable albums of the year" that is powered by her "lithe, Broadway-honed voice". At The New York Times, Jon Caramanica gave a positive review of the album, writing that television shows such as American Idol and Glee "have been responsible for an intense surge of interest in music on television, but they haven't left much of a mark on the shape of pop. That's because both shows are fundamentally conservative institutions, privileging the familiar and the unchallenging. They're about emulating, not innovating." Caramanica commended Grande for becoming the first "identifiable pop star" who takes the "rules of those enterprises, uses them as a foundation, and innovates atop them... She uses the "Glee"/"Idol" template as a jumping-off point to make modern pop-R&B with a sturdy vintage backbone."

Writing in his track-by-track review Jason Lipshutz from Billboard rated the album an eighty-six out of 100, saying that "Yours Truly carries the expectations of a young singer who has already proven herself on the pop charts, and even if the songs on her debut could not equal the quality of "The Way," Grande had the fan base and powerful pipes to survive a misfire." At PopMatters, Scott Interrante rated the album eight discs out of ten, writing that "Minor missteps aside, Yours Truly is ultimately an impressive debut for Grande." Ryan Dennehy of AbsolutePunk rated the album a 70-percent, stating that "Yours Truly is more tempered and less likely to put you in a beaming state of catatonia" that is "a missive containing some of her most personal thoughts and her oft-regrettable youthful impulses." At Pitchfork, Andrew Ryce rated the album a 6.5 out of ten, calling it "a very safe record." Lewis Conner of Digital Spy rated the album four stars out of five, writing how "The production feels fresh, the lyrics are relatable and the melodies are as cool and sweet as a dollop of raspberry ripple", and where he also states that "The tone and pace of the album rarely changes, but the songs feel accomplished, polished and vibrant". Corner concluded by calling "Yours Truly" a "little less than a triumph." At The Michigan Daily, Gregory Hicks graded the album a B, saying "most tracks are of quality composition, lyrically and melodically, but beat usage becomes excessive at times." Jim Farber of The New York Daily News rated the album three stars out of five, stating that because the "armies of song doctors" that the release is "far more tuneful than Mariah's interchangeable hits."

Commercial performance

On September 4, 2013, Billboard reported that Yours Truly would most likely sell between 110,000 and 120,000 copies in its first week in the United States by the end of September 11, 2013. Yours Truly officially debuted at the top of the US Billboard 200 chart, with 138,000 copies sold in its first week, becoming Grande's first number-one album as a solo artist.
This made Grande the fifteenth female artist ever and the first female artist to have their first album debut atop of the charts since January 2010, when Kesha's Animal opened at number one. Grande's sales were especially strong digitally, as 108,000 of her first-week sales were from digital downloads, while the album sold 30,000 copies through physical sales. In its second week, the album dropped eight places to number nine selling 31,000 more copies, bringing its total sales in the United States to 169,000. As of June 2020, the album has sold 615,000 copies in the United States and was certified platinum by the Recording Industry Association of America (RIAA) on March 22, 2016, for shipments of one million copies.

Yours Truly also debuted in the top ten in several other countries, including Australia, where it debuted at number six; the United Kingdom, where it debuted at number seven; Ireland, where it debuted at number six; and the Netherlands, where it debuted at number five. It also debuted just outside the top ten on New Zealand's top forty chart at number eleven.

In 2013, Yours Truly was ranked as the 106th most popular album of the year on the Billboard 200. It then went on to become the 68th most popular album on that chart the following year.

Track listing
Credits adapted from the album's liner notesNotes There is an unreleased track called "Do You Love Me" featuring Sky Blu from LMFAO that did not make the final track listing on the album and was delayed for unknown reasons.

 signifies a co-producer
 signifies a vocal producer
 signifies an additional producer
 signifies a remixer
 "Right There" contains a sample of "Rain Dance", performed by The Jeff Lorber Fusion and written by Jeff Lorber.
 "Lovin' It" contains a sample of "Real Love", performed by Mary J. Blige and written by Mark Morales, Kirk Robinson, Nathaniel Robinson, Mark Rooney and Roy Hammond.
 "The Way" contains a sample of "A Little Bit of Love", written and performed by Brenda Russell; and interpolates "Still Not a Player", performed by Big Pun, which also samples Russell's "A Little Bit of Love".
 "Popular Song" contains an interpolation of "Popular", from the musical Wicked, originally performed by Kristin Chenoweth and written by Stephen Schwartz.

Personnel
Adapted from AllMusic and album liner notes.Ariana Grande – Yours Truly. Album booklet. Republic Records (Universal Music Group).Vocalists and musiciansAriana Grande – lead vocals
Big Sean – featured artist
Mac Miller – featured artist
Nathan Sykes – featured artist
Mika – featured artist
Leon Thomas III – background vocals
Carmen Reece – background vocals
Courtney Harrell – background vocals
India Benét – background vocals
Giovanna Clayton – cello
Vanessa Freebarin-Smith – cello
Paula Hochalter – cello
John Catchings – cello
Anthony LaMarchina – cello
Pamela Sixfin – string contractor, violin
Ben Devitt – trombone
Andrew Carney – trumpet
Fabio Spinella – trumpet
Monisa Angell – viola
Kristin Wilkinson – viola
David Angell – violin
David Davidson – violin
Clayton Haslop – violin
Sharon Jackson – violin
Songa Lee – violin
Mark Robertson – violin
Julie Rogers – violin
Mary Kathryn Van Osdale – violin
Serg Dimitrijevic – guitar
Joe Friedman – guitar
Randy Ellis – horn arrangements, tenor saxophoneManagerial and creativeChelsea Avery – A&R, A&R coordinator
Wendy Goldstein – A&R
Naim McNair – A&R
Kristin Hodge – album design
Harmony Samuels – executive producer
Scott "Scooter" Braun – executive producer, management
Allison Kaye – management
Jones Crow – photographer
Laura Hess – marketing managerTechnical'

Ariana Grande – executive producer, vocal producer(all tracks)
Jason Nevins – additional producer, drum programming, keyboard programming, mixing
Nick Littlemore – additional production
Mo-Keyz – additional production
Justin Hergett – assistant engineer, mixing assistant
James Krausse – assistant engineer, mixing assistant
Maximilian Jaeger – assistant engineer
Trehy Harris – assistant
Ryan Kaul – assistant
Khristopher Riddick-Tynes – producer, composer, drum programming, engineer
Harmony Samuels –  instrumentation, producer
Mika –   producer, vocals
Antonio Dixon –   horn arrangements, producer
Matt Squire –   instrumentation, producer
Kenneth "Babyface" Edmonds –   producer
Rickey "Slikk" Offord –   producer
Travis Sayles –  producer
Phillip Lassiter – string arrangements
Joel Mott – string arrangements
James Waddell – string engineer
Carmen Reece – vocal arrangement, vocal producer
Rob Kinelski – vocal mixing
Mark Asari – vocal producer
Jo Blaq – vocal producer
Talay Riley – vocal producer
Peter Kent – concert master
Bill Meyers – conductor, string arrangements
Ivy Skoff – contractor
Peter Stengaard – engineer, vocal producer
Paul Boutin – engineer
Jose Cardoza – engineer
Larry Goetz – engineer
Roy Hendrickson – engineer
Carlos King – engineer
Ian MacGregor – engineer
Tommy Brown – instrumentation, producer
Ced Solo – keyboard programming
Donna Gryn – marketing
Brad Haugen – marketing
Tom Coyne – mastering
Aya Merrill – mastering
Jon Castelli – mixing engineer
Jaycen Joshua – mixing
Sribz Riley – vocal engineer
Tony Maserati – mixing
Greg Wells – producer, programming
Nathaniel Motte – producer
The Rascals – producer
Henry Hey – programming

Charts

Weekly charts

Year-end charts

Certifications and sales

See also
List of number-one albums of 2013 (U.S.)

References

External links
 

2013 debut albums
Albums produced by Babyface (musician)
Albums produced by Greg Wells
Albums produced by Harmony Samuels
Albums produced by Tommy Brown (record producer)
Albums recorded at Armoury Studios
Ariana Grande albums
Republic Records albums